Pershino is a rural locality (a village) in Fominskoye Rural Settlement, Gorokhovetsky District, Vladimir Oblast, Russia. The population was 6 as of 2010.

Geography 
Pershino is located 37 km southwest of Gorokhovets (the district's administrative centre) by road. Borzakovo is the nearest rural locality.

References 

Rural localities in Gorokhovetsky District